Euanthe may refer to:

Greek mythology (Εὐάνθη)
 Euanthe, possible name for the mother of the Charites by Zeus
 Euanthe, one of the would-be sacrificial victims of Minotaur

Other uses (derived from the above)

 Euanthe (moon), a small moon of Jupiter
 Euanthe sanderiana, a junior synonym of the orchid species Vanda sanderiana